Gehaz El Reyada El Askari Stadium, is a multi-use stadium with an all-seated capacity of 20,000 located in Cairo Governorate, Egypt. It is the home for Tala'ea El Gaish.

References 

Football venues in Egypt
Stadiums in Cairo
Multi-purpose stadiums in Egypt
Egypt
Athletics (track and field) venues in Egypt
Football in Cairo